Lindenhof may refer to:

 Switzerland
 Lindenhof (Rapperswil), a hill and historical core of Rapperswil.
 Lindenhof (Zürich), district of that name in its correct name.
 Lindenhof, district or geographical location of that name.
 Lindenhof (quarter), district of that name, redirect to Altstadt (Zürich)
 Lindenhof hill, geographical formation, moraine, and public hilltop square in Zürich
 Oppidum Zürich-Lindenhof
 Germany
 Lindenhof locality in Hatzfeld
 Theater Lindenhof nearby Burladingen